In computer science, an in-place algorithm is an algorithm which transforms input using no auxiliary data structure. However, a small amount of extra storage space is allowed for auxiliary variables. The input is usually overwritten by the output as the algorithm executes. An in-place algorithm updates its input sequence only through replacement or swapping of elements. An algorithm which is not in-place is sometimes called not-in-place or out-of-place.

In-place can have slightly different meanings. In its strictest form, the algorithm can only have a constant amount of extra space, counting everything including function calls and pointers. However, this form is very limited as simply having an index to a length  array requires  bits. More broadly, in-place means that the algorithm does not use extra space for manipulating the input but may require a small though nonconstant extra space for its operation. Note that space complexity also has varied choices in whether or not to count the index lengths as part of the space used. Often, the space complexity is given in terms of the number of indices or pointers needed, ignoring their length. In this article, we refer to total space complexity (DSPACE), counting pointer lengths. Therefore, the space requirements here have an extra  factor compared to an analysis that ignores the length of indices and pointers.  

An algorithm may or may not count the output as part of its space usage. Since in-place algorithms usually overwrite their input with output, no additional space is needed. When writing the output to write-only memory or a stream, it may be more appropriate to only consider the working space of the algorithm. In theoretical applications such as log-space reductions, it is more typical to always ignore output space (in these cases it is more essential that the output is write-only).

Examples 

Given an array  of  items, suppose we want an array that holds the same elements in reversed order and to dispose of the original.

  function reverse(a[0..n - 1])
      allocate b[0..n - 1]
      for i from 0 to n - 1
          b[n − 1 − i] := a[i]
      return b

Unfortunately, this requires  extra space for having the arrays  and  available simultaneously. Also, allocation and deallocation are often slow operations.

  function reverse_in_place(a[0..n-1])
      for i from 0 to floor((n-2)/2)
          tmp := a[i]
          a[i] := a[n − 1 − i]
          a[n − 1 − i] := tmp

As another example, many sorting algorithms rearrange arrays into sorted order in-place, including: bubble sort, comb sort, selection sort, insertion sort, heapsort, and Shell sort.

Quicksort operates in-place on the data to be sorted. However, quicksort requires  stack space pointers to keep track of the subarrays in its divide and conquer strategy. Consequently, quicksort needs  additional space. Although this non-constant space technically takes quicksort out of the in-place category, quicksort and other algorithms needing only  additional pointers are usually considered in-place algorithms.

Most selection algorithms are also in-place, although some considerably rearrange the input array in the process of finding the final, constant-sized result.

Some text manipulation algorithms such as trim and reverse may be done in-place.

In computational complexity 

In computational complexity theory, the strict definition of in-place algorithms includes all algorithms with  space complexity, the class DSPACE(1). This class is very limited; it equals the regular languages. In fact, it does not even include any of the examples listed above.

We usually consider algorithms in L, the class of problems requiring  additional space, to be in-place. This class is more in line with the practical definition, as it allows numbers of size  as pointers or indices. This expanded definition still excludes quicksort, however, because of its recursive calls.  

Identifying the in-place algorithms with L has some interesting implications; for example, it means that there is a (rather complex) in-place algorithm to determine whether a path exists between two nodes in an undirected graph, a problem that requires  extra space using typical algorithms such as depth-first search (a visited bit for each node). This in turn yields in-place algorithms for problems such as determining if a graph is bipartite or testing whether two graphs have the same number of connected components. See SL for more information.

Role of randomness 

In many cases, the space requirements of an algorithm can be drastically cut by using a randomized algorithm. For example, say we wish to know if two vertices in a graph of  vertices are in the same connected component of the graph. There is no known simple, deterministic, in-place algorithm to determine this, but if we simply start at one vertex and perform a random walk of about  steps, the chance that we will stumble across the other vertex provided that it is in the same component is very high. Similarly, there are simple randomized in-place algorithms for primality testing such as the Miller–Rabin primality test, and there are also simple in-place randomized factoring algorithms such as Pollard's rho algorithm. See RL and BPL for more discussion of this phenomenon.

In functional programming 

Functional programming languages often discourage or do not support explicit in-place algorithms that overwrite data, since this is a type of side effect; instead, they only allow new data to be constructed. However, good functional language compilers will often recognize when an object very similar to an existing one is created and then the old one is thrown away, and will optimize this into a simple mutation "under the hood".

Note that it is possible in principle to carefully construct in-place algorithms that do not modify data (unless the data is no longer being used), but this is rarely done in practice. See purely functional data structures.

See also 
 Table of in-place and not-in-place sorting algorithms

References 

Algorithms